Folwark  is a part of Dziecinów village, Gmina Sobienie-Jeziory, Poland.The population is near 120. From 1975 to 1998 this place was in Siedlce Voivodeship.

Villages in Otwock County